Laura Beatrice Mancini (January 17, 1821 – July 17, 1869), born Laura Beatrice Oliva, was an Italian poet.

Laura Oliva was born in Naples, and in 1840 married Italian jurist and statesman Pasquale Stanislao Mancini. She wrote a variety of poetry, and ran a literary salon for liberal-minded Neapolitans from the 1840s. Many of her poems focused on contemporary political events (see Italian unification), especially after 1860.

Works
 Ines (1845)
 Colombo al convento della Rabida (1846)
 Poesie varie (1848)
 L'Italia sulla tomba di Vincenzo Gioberti (1853)
 Patria ed amore (1874)

References

1821 births
1869 deaths
19th-century Neapolitan people
Italian women poets
19th-century poets
19th-century Italian women writers
19th-century Italian writers
Italian salon-holders